Ragwŏn County is a county in South Hamgyŏng province, North Korea.  Formerly known as T'oejo (퇴조), it was named in 1982 after Ragwŏn, paradise.

Geography
It borders the Sea of Japan (East Sea of Korea) to the south and east. Most of the county is mountainous. The highest point is Chonchubong (천주봉).  The coastal area includes the islands such as Chonchodo (전초도) and Chintudo (진두도).  Forestland occupies about 75% of the county's area.

Administrative divisions
Ragwŏn county is divided into 1 ŭp (town), 1 rodongjagu (workers' district) and 11 ri (villages):

Economy
The local economy is centered on fishing.  Abalone are harvested abundantly from Ragwon Bay.  The processing of marine goods is also a developed local business. Local agriculture is dominated by maize.  There are also orchards and a small amount of heavy industry.

Transportation
Ragwŏn county is served by the P'yŏngra line of the Korean State Railway.

See also
Geography of North Korea
Administrative divisions of North Korea
South Hamgyong

References

External links

Counties of South Hamgyong